The 1966 Washington State Cougars football team was an American football team that represented Washington State University in the Athletic Association of Western Universities (AAWU) during the 1966 NCAA University Division football season. Led by third-year head coach Bert Clark, the Cougars compiled a  record (1–3 in AAWU, tie for sixth), and were outscored  211 to 132. Two home games were played on campus at Rogers Field in Pullman, and three at Joe Albi Stadium in Spokane.

The team's statistical leaders included Jerry Henderson with 989 passing yards, Ammon McWashington with 298 rushing yards, and Doug Flansburg with 613 receiving yards.

The trip to the Houston Astrodome in September included a jet flight, the first for Cougar  It was the first college football game played on artificial turf, the majority (baseball outfield) of the AstroTurf was installed two months earlier in July.

After consecutive losses in the Battle of the Palouse, WSU scored two late touchdowns to defeat Idaho  in the chilly mud at Neale Stadium on October 22; the Cougars have not played in neighboring Moscow since.

Washington State defeated Oregon in the final varsity football game at Hayward Field. In the rivlary game with Washington at Spokane, the Cougars lost for the eighth straight year.

Schedule

Roster

NFL/AFL Draft
Three Cougars were selected in the 1967 NFL/AFL Draft.

References

External links
 Game program: California vs. WSU at Spokane – September 17, 1966
 Game program: Baylor vs. WSU at Spokane – October 1, 1966
 Game program: Arizona State at WSU – October 8, 1966
 Game program: WSU at Utah – October 15, 1966
 Game program: Oregon State at WSU – October 29, 1966
 Game program: Washington vs. WSU at Spokane – November 19, 1966

Washington State
Washington State Cougars football seasons
Washington State Cougars football